is a village located in Shiribeshi Subprefecture, Hokkaido, Japan. As of September 2016, the village had a population of 1,750, and a density of 21 persons per km2.

Etymology
The name of the town originates from the word "Hemoi-tomari" in the Ainu language. "Hemoi-tomari" is formed from two Ainu-language words, the first, "hemoi", meaning "trout", and the second, "tomari", meaning "harbor". In the Japanese language the name of the town is written with a single kanji character, meaning "anchored" or "at anchor". The written form of the name in Japanese is an ateji, or a kanji character used to phonetically represent native or borrowed words.

Geography
Tomari is situated on the western coast of the Shakotan Peninsula along the Sea of Japan. Tomari is known for its view of the sunset on the Sea of Japan. The coast of the village is protected as part of Niseko-Shakotan-Otaru Kaigan Quasi-National Park.

Neighboring towns and village
 Kamoenai
 Furubira
 Kyōwa

Economy

The village is known for fishing and seafood, including sea urchin (uni), sea cucumber (namako) and squid (ika).

Tomari has been linked with energy and power generation since the beginning of the 20th century, giving it its current nickname of "Hometown of Energy". The village is famous for being the site of Hokkaido's only nuclear power plant, the Tomari Nuclear Power Plant. Its first reactor became operational in 1989, and its second in 1991. Tax revenue from the nuclear power plant has ensured that Tomari's local government, unlike most rural villages, operates at a consistent surplus.

History
Historically, the Kayanuma area of the village was a coal mining town. The town was first settled by the Japanese in 1601, and was incorporated as a village in 1880. The villages of Sakazaki, Okishinai, Horikatsubu, and Kayanuma were merged into Tomari in 1909.

Sister city
 Ikata, Ehime, Japan

Education
 Junior high school
 Tomari Junior High School
 Elementary school
 Tomari Elementary School

References

External links

Official Website 

Villages in Hokkaido